The 1997 German Grand Prix (formally the LIX Grosser Mobil 1 Preis von Deutschland) was a Formula One motor race held at Hockenheim, Baden-Württemberg, Germany on 27 July 1997. It was the tenth race of the 1997 Formula One World Championship.

The 45-lap race was won by Austrian Gerhard Berger, driving a Benetton-Renault. Having missed the previous three races due to a sinus problem, Berger took pole position and led the race from start to finish, except for the pit stops. It was Berger's tenth and final Grand Prix victory, and the 27th and last for the Benetton team. It was also the last victory for an Austrian driver, . Local driver Michael Schumacher finished second in a Ferrari, with Finn Mika Häkkinen third in a McLaren-Mercedes.

With Jacques Villeneuve failing to finish in his Williams-Renault, Schumacher extended his lead over the Canadian in the Drivers' Championship to 10 points.

Report

Background
Going into the race, the Drivers' Championship had developed into a battle between Ferrari driver Michael Schumacher and Williams driver Jacques Villeneuve. Schumacher led Villeneuve by four points, 47 to 43, although Villeneuve had won four races to Schumacher's three. Jean Alesi, driving for Benetton, was a distant third on 21 points. Similarly, the Constructors' Championship had become a battle between Ferrari and Williams, with the Italian team leading by three points, 65 to 62, and both well clear of Benetton in third on 35 points.

Following the British Grand Prix on 13 July, the teams conducted testing sessions at the Autodromo Nazionale Monza from July 14–17. Shinji Nakano (Prost) set the fastest time on the first day, while Giancarlo Fisichella (Jordan) topped the second day's running. Johnny Herbert (Sauber) was fastest on the third day and Ralf Schumacher (Jordan) set the fastest time on the final day of running.

There was one driver change heading into the race. Having been in one of the two Benetton cars since the seventh race of the season at Canada, Alexander Wurz stood down from his role as race driver and was replaced by Gerhard Berger. Berger was forced to miss the previous three rounds due to a reoccurring sinus problem, requiring two operations.

On 22 July, four days before the event's first free practice sessions took place, Benetton confirmed the team would sign Fisichella for 1998, while the organisers of the German Grand Prix signed a deal with the Fédération Internationale de l'Automobile (FIA), to continue hosting the race until 2001.

Practice and qualifying
Four practice sessions were held before the Sunday race—two on Friday, and two on Saturday. The Friday morning and afternoon sessions each lasted an hour. The third and final practice sessions were held on Saturday morning and lasted 45 minutes. The two practice sessions were affected by occasionally damp and wet conditions, which made the track moderately slippery. Ralf Schumacher set the session's fastest time, with a lap of 1:46.196, one-tenth of a second quicker than Michael Schumacher.

Saturday's afternoon qualifying session lasted for an hour. Each driver was limited to twelve laps, with the grid order decided by the drivers' fastest laps. During this session, the 107% rule was in effect, which necessitated each driver set a time within 107% of the quickest lap to qualify for the race. Berger clinched the twelfth pole position of his career, and the first for the Benetton team since the 1995 Japanese Grand Prix with a time of 1:41.873. He said his lap time was "more or less" capable of what he could achieve and almost lost control of his Benetton on his final timed run before he spun at Sachs Kurve. Berger was joined on the front row of the grid by Fisichella who recorded a lap 0.023 seconds slower than Berger and felt he could have taken pole-position as he slid at Opel corner. Häkkinen qualified third and was satisfied with his performance; he was quicker than Berger in the first sector of the track but drove on at the Senna chicane and was delayed by Berger's spin. Michael Schumacher took fourth and experimented with a higher downforce set-up during the session. He was ahead of Frentzen in the faster of the two Williams and was afflicted with poor grip and balance. Alesi took sixth having spun his car in the final minute of the session. Ralf Schumacher braked late for the Ost chicane on his first timed run, and lost four-tenths of a second in the track's infield section during his next run and secured seventh overall. Coulthard managed eighth and spun off into the gravel trap at the turn 15 right-hand corner towards the end of the session. Villeneuve was afflicted with a  straight-line speed deficit in his race car and switched to the spare Williams set up for Frentzen which was harder to handle and he was restricted to ninth. Irvine completed the top ten and reported his car ran badly over the kerbs lining the track but was confident he would have a more competitive Grand Prix.

Race
The drivers took to the track at 09:30 CEST (UTC+1) for a 30-minute warm-up session.

Giancarlo Fisichella took his first ever front-row start, and was challenging Berger for the win until he punctured a tyre on the debris of Rubens Barrichello's blown engine. This same incident had helped him gain the lead, as the smoke from the engine delayed Berger prior to his pit stop. Fisichella only led for two laps before Berger repassed him. After Fisichella broke down due to damage from the flailing tyre (caused while he tried to drive back to the pits), Michael Schumacher gave him a lift back to the pits after the race.

Jacques Villeneuve had a disastrous race, spinning off while trying to overtake rookie Jarno Trulli, thus losing championship ground to Schumacher. The latter's team-mate Eddie Irvine and Villeneuve's team-mate Heinz-Harald Frentzen collided at the first corner, with David Coulthard also forced out by damage from the incident.

Berger's last win would also be the last for Benetton, just as Berger's first win had been the team's first. It was also Benetton's only win as an Italian-licensed constructor.

This was the last Grand Prix win for the Enstone-based Formula One team until the 2003 Hungarian Grand Prix, and, the last for an Austrian driver.

Classification

Qualifying

Race

Championship standings after the race

Drivers' Championship standings

Constructors' Championship standings

References

German Grand Prix
German Grand Prix
Grand Prix
German Grand Prix